Cerro Picacho is a mountain located in the Cordillera Central, in the northern Chiriquí Province of Panama. It has a height of 2874 meters and is the fourth highest mountain in the country.

References

Picacho
North American 2000 m summits